Benny J. Shendo Jr. is an American politician serving as a Democratic member of the New Mexico Senate, representing District 22 since January 15, 2013. Shendo's district covers Jemez Pueblo, New Mexico.

Education
Shendo earned his BS in business from the University of Colorado Boulder.

Elections
2012 Shendo challenged District 22 incumbent Democratic Senator Lynda Lovejoy in the four-way June 5, 2012 Democratic Primary, winning with 1,989 votes (40.9%) and was unopposed for the November 6, 2012 General election, winning with 12,051 votes.
2008 When incumbent Democratic United States Representative Tom Udall ran for United States Senate and left New Mexico's 3rd congressional district seat open, Shendo ran in the six-way June 8, 2008 Democratic Primary but lost to New Mexico Public Regulation Commissioner Ben R. Luján. The latter won the three-way November 4, 2008 General election.

References

External links
Official page, New Mexico Legislature
Campaign site

"Benny Shendo", Ballotpedia
Benny J. Shendo, Jr. at OpenSecrets

Place of birth missing (living people)
Year of birth missing (living people)
Living people
Native American state legislators in New Mexico
Democratic Party New Mexico state senators
Politicians from Las Cruces, New Mexico
University of Colorado Boulder alumni
University of Colorado Law School alumni
21st-century American politicians